The Canton of Romilly-sur-Seine-1 is a former canton of the arrondissement of Nogent-sur-Seine, in the Aube department, in northern France. It had 9,558 inhabitants (2012). It was disbanded following the French canton reorganisation which came into effect in March 2015. It consisted of 12 communes:

Crancey
La Fosse-Corduan
Gélannes
Maizières-la-Grande-Paroisse 
Origny-le-Sec
Orvilliers-Saint-Julien
Ossey-les-Trois-Maisons
Pars-lès-Romilly
Romilly-sur-Seine (partly)
Saint-Hilaire-sous-Romilly 
Saint-Loup-de-Buffigny
Saint-Martin-de-Bossenay

References 

Romilly-sur-Seine-1st
2015 disestablishments in France
States and territories disestablished in 2015